Franciszek Żmurko (18 July 1859, Lviv – 9 October 1910, Warsaw) was a Polish realist painter. Żmurko began drawing lessons as a young boy in his hometown with the painter Franciszek Tepa. As an adolescent he relocated to Kraków to study at the Academy of Fine Arts where he took lessons from Professor Jan Matejko. In 1877 Żmurko moved to Vienna, Austria where he was accepted at the Vienna Academy, but left soon thereafter to study under Alexander von Wagner in Munich. Żmurko returned to Kraków in 1880 and then moved to Warsaw in 1882 where he remained until his death in 1910.

Notable works
 Zygmunt August i Barbara
 Zuzanna i starcy, 1879
 Z rozkazu padyszacha, 1881
 Nubijczyk, 1884
 Portret kobiety z wachlarzem, 1884
 Widzenie Fausta, 1890
 Kazimierz Wielki i Esterka
 Portret kobiety z wachlarzem i papierosem, 1891
 Autoportret z paletą, 1895
 Portret młodej kobiety, 1896
 Studium do obrazu "Laudamus feminam", c. 1900
 Półakt kobiecy, c. 1900
 Una donna
 Czarne warkocze, 1907

Selected works

See also 
 Wawrzyniec Żmurko, mathematician, father of Franciszek

External links

Gallery at Wikimedia Commons
Selection of Works
Biography at Tom Podl Collection

19th-century Polish painters
19th-century Polish male artists
20th-century Polish painters
20th-century Polish male artists
1859 births
1910 deaths
Polish male painters